Sir Walter Peacock  (24 May 1871 – 24 February 1956) was a British Liberal Party politician and barrister who worked for the future King Edward VIII of the United Kingdom during the latter's tenure as Prince of Wales.

Background
He was the son of the Rt Hon. Sir Barnes Peacock. He was educated at Eton and Trinity College, Cambridge. He married, in 1927, Irene Cynthia Le Mesurier (biographer of Queen Elizabeth II, Bernard Montgomery, 1st Viscount Montgomery of Alamein, Prince Charles and Princess Anne, and author of An Authoritative Account, The Adventure of Cooking, Cooking is Exciting and Beating Austerity in the Kitchen).

Career
Peacock was called to the bar at the Inner Temple, 1894. He was Resident Councillor and Keeper of the Records of the Duchy of Cornwall and a Member of the Prince of Wales’ Council from 1908 to 1930. He was Treasurer to the Prince of Wales from 1910–15. He was a Member of the Royal Fine Art Commission from 1930–34.

Political career
He was Liberal candidate for the Camborne Division of Cornwall at the 1935 United Kingdom general election. This was a traditionally Liberal seat that the party had lost to the Conservatives in 1931 and had hopes of regaining. However, Peacock was unsuccessful;

He did not stand for parliament again, however, in 1936 he was elected to serve on the Liberal Party Council.

Awards
He was made a member of the Royal Victorian Order 1911 MVO, 1916 CVO, and 1924 KCVO. He was an Honorary member of the Royal Institute of British Architects.

References

1871 births
1956 deaths
Knights Commander of the Royal Victorian Order
People educated at Eton College
Alumni of Trinity College, Cambridge
English barristers